World Trade Park is a shopping mall in Malviya Nagar, Jaipur, Rajasthan, India. It was officially opened in the later half of 2012.

Construction
The construction of World Trade Park Jaipur started in back 2009 and took US$50,000,000 and was completed in two years. The building has two different blocks; one north and one south, separated by a city street. The two buildings are joined by a bridge, which has restaurants.

Mr Anoop Bartaria is the chairman and managing director of World Trade Park and Sincere Group of companies. World Trade Park Jaipur was inaugurated by Shahrukh Khan in 2012.

World Trade Park Jaipur includes a display system where 24 projectors create a single image on its ceiling. This is the first system of its kind in the world. WTP was awarded "Mall of the Year" and "Best Architecture" by BCI of India.

Some more projects are under construction in WTP, like "Under Water Restaurant", "Classy Auditorium", "Banquet Hall (for wedding functions and parties)", "International Media Center", "WTP Hotel with World Class Luxury Rooms",

WTP Hotel 
WTP Hotel is under construction and is scheduled to open in August 2021.

References

External links
 Official website

Buildings and structures in Jaipur
Shopping malls established in 2012
2012 establishments in Rajasthan
Shopping malls in Rajasthan
Economy of Jaipur